The  Albany Empire season was the first season for the franchise in the Arena Football League. The Empire play home games at the Times Union Center.

Standings

Roster

Staff

Schedule

Regular season
The 2018 regular season schedule was released on February 13, 2018.

Playoffs

References

Albany Empire
Albany Empire (AFL) seasons
Albany Empire (AFL)